Chandika Nanayakkara (චන්දික නානායක්කාර) [Sinhala]), is an actor in Sri Lankan cinema and television. Nanayakkara won the award for the most popular actor in Sumathi Awards in two consecutive years, 2009 and 2010. He is mostly working in television serials.

Personal life
His father was the deputy principal as well as disciplinary teacher of his school and mother was a housewife. He has two sisters and a brother. He completed A/L education from Gankanda National College, Pelmadulla. At school, he placed third in an all-island Creative Writing competition.

Acting career
At school stage, he became a regular visitor to watch weekly stage dramas held at school. He continued to attend drama seminars organized by renowned artists like Kaushalya Fernando and Mahendra Perera. In 2003, he won the ‘Tharumansala’ competition organised by Sirasa TV. His beginning into the acting was accidental. While enrolled into Open University of Sri Lanka he met a friend working on a film set. He asked from Nanayakkara to do a small part in his movie Mother Theresa. In 2006, he produced a tele series Suba Sihina with one of his friends. Then his next tele production came through Haratha Hera. He involved for the first Russian television series filmed in Sri Lanka.

On 11 November 2008, he took part in Tharu-Rayak show held in Dubai. He is the brand ambassador for Lak Salu Sala. After 17 years, he graduated with a degree in Mass Communication which he started in 1994 from Open University of Sri Lanka.

Selected television serials

 Adaraya Gindarak
 Ama
 Asirimath Daladagamanaya
 Bath Amma
 Bawa Sarana
 Bhawa Siddhantha
 Click
 Daangale
 Daskon
 Dedunu
 Doni
 Doowaru
 Hansi
 Haratha Hera
 Hima Kandulu
 Isuru Sangramaya
 Ithin Eeta Passe
 Jeewithaya Thawa Durai
 Kumee
 Kurulu Pihatu
 Labendiye
 Medagedara
 Me Mamai
 Minipura Hatana
 Mini Kirana
 Mosam Sulan
 Muthu
 Nethu
 Olu
 Palingu Piyapath
 Premathi Jayathi Soko
 Ran Sevaneli
 Sanda Hiru Tharu
 Sara
 Sarisara Lihini
 Sihinyaki Jeewithe
 Siththaravi
 Sneha
 Suba Sihina Ahawarai
 Sudu Anguru
 Surangana Duwa
 Susumaka Ima
 Thodu
 Thune Kelesiya
 Uthpala
 Veronika
 Vesak Sanda Ra
 Visula Ahasa Yata
 Waluka
 Warna
 Wasuli Kanda

Filmography
His maiden cinematic experience came through a supportive role in 2008 film Hathara Denama Soorayo, which was a remake of the 1971 film by the same name directed by Neil Rupasinghe. Since then, he has acted in about 7 films, mostly in supportive characters.

Awards and Accolades
He has won several awards for the Best Actor, Supporting Actor and Popular Actor in many local television award festivals.

Sumathi Awards

|-
|| 2008 ||| Vesak Sanda Ra || Jury Award || 
|-
|| 2008 ||| Suba Sihina Ahawarai || Best Upcoming Actor || 
|-
|| 2009 ||| through people's vote || Most Popular Actor || 
|-
|| 2010 ||| through people's vote || Most Popular Actor ||

References

External links
 Stars lend hand to worthy cause
 රථම ප්‍රේමය ඇරඹුවේ හැමදාටම දුක සැප බෙදා ගැනීමට ආරාධනා කරමින් 
 STARS lend hand to worthy cause
 Comic story comes to miniscreen
 ගිනි අවිය අතහැර දැමූ ශාන්ති කුමාර් ගෝකුලන් දේශීය සිනමාවට එක් වෙයි
 මගේ පුද්ගලික ජීවිතේ ගැන මම නොදන්න දේවලුත් සමහර අය දන්නවා - චන්දික නානායක්කාර
 චන්දික නානායක්කාරට ගැහැනු ළමයින්ගෙන් ඇස් රතුවන විහිළුවක්

Sri Lankan male film actors
Sinhalese male actors
Living people
Sri Lankan male television actors
Year of birth missing (living people)